Polygamy is legal in Kuwait. Nearly 2% of all marriages are polygamous. It has been reported that polygamy is on the decline among the younger generation.

References 

Kuwait